Nadeem Razi is a Pakistani politician who was a Member of the Provincial Assembly of Sindh from May 2013 to May 2018.

Early life and education
He was born on 3 June 1966 in Karachi.

He has a degree of Bachelor of Commerce from Karachi University.

Political career

He was elected to the Provincial Assembly of Sindh as a candidate of Mutahida Quami Movement from Constituency PS-121 KARACHI-XXXIII in 2013 Pakistani general election. In September 2017, he quit MQM and joined Pak Sarzameen Party.

References

Living people
Sindh MPAs 2013–2018
1966 births
Muttahida Qaumi Movement politicians
University of Karachi alumni